Volkovo is a rural locality (a selo) and the administrative centre of Volkovsky Selsoviet, Blagoveshchensky District, Bashkortostan, Russia. The population was 218 as of 2010. There are 2 streets.

Geography 
Volkovo is located 41 km northeast of Blagoveshchensk (the district's administrative centre) by road. Kuliki is the nearest rural locality.

References 

Rural localities in Blagoveshchensky District